OpenSimplex noise is an n-dimensional (up to 4D) gradient noise function that was developed in order to overcome the patent-related issues surrounding simplex noise, while likewise avoiding the visually-significant directional artifacts characteristic of Perlin noise.

The algorithm shares numerous similarities with simplex noise, but has two primary differences:
 Whereas simplex noise starts with a hypercubic honeycomb and squashes it down the main diagonal in order to form its grid structure, OpenSimplex noise instead swaps the skew and inverse-skew factors and uses a stretched hypercubic honeycomb. The stretched hypercubic honeycomb becomes a simplectic honeycomb after subdivision. This means that 2D Simplex and 2D OpenSimplex both use different orientations of the triangular tiling, but whereas 3D Simplex uses the tetragonal disphenoid honeycomb, 3D OpenSimplex uses the tetrahedral-octahedral honeycomb.
 OpenSimplex noise uses a larger kernel size than simplex noise. The result is a smoother appearance at the cost of performance, as additional vertices need to be determined and factored into each evaluation.

OpenSimplex has a variant called "SuperSimplex" (or OpenSimplex2S), which is visually smoother. "OpenSimplex2F" is identical to the original SuperSimplex.

See also 
 Value noise
 Worley noise

References

External links 
 Blog post introducing OpenSimplex noise
 Author's current implementation (OpenSimplex2)
 Android library
 C implementation
 GPU implementation in OpenCL
 Heavily-optimized implementation in C#
 Noise library for the Rust programming language providing OpenSimplex noise – does not hard code gradient initial values
 Python implementation

Noise (graphics)